Gnayiru, is a suburb located North of Chennai, a metropolitan city in Tamil Nadu, India.

References

External links
CMDA Official Webpage

Neighbourhoods in Chennai